Pace I-90 Express Bus Service is an on highway express bus service between Rosemont Transportation Center and Elgin operated by Pace. The buses operate on the Jane Addams Memorial Tollway and use "flex lanes" to avoid traffic, similar to a bus on shoulder service.

History 
Planning for an extension of the Blue Line past O'Hare began in 1998. However, after a series of proposals were presented in 2003, local leaders preferred Metra's Plan: the STAR Line. When Metra started planning for the STAR Line, surveying revealed natural gas lines that Metra would have to pay to relocate. The project ultimately failed to get federal funding.

After the STAR Line failed to get funding, Pace Bus began planning for its I-90 Express service as part of its Vision 2020. Service between Rosemont and Elgin, and Schaumburg and Elgin, began in December 2016. In December 2017, the IL 25 Station opened.  In August 2018, Barrington Road Station, the on-highway train station like stop, opened, finishing the project.

The Pace Express service has been described as a "mini STAR Line."

Service 
 
The service operates as four routes: 600, 603, 605, and 607.

600: Rosemont - Schaumburg Express 
Exclusivity operates nonstop between Rosemont Transportation Center and Northwest Transportation Center in Schaumburg. This was a peak-only route before the introduction of the I-90 Express service.

603: Elgin Transportation Center - Rosemont Express 
Operates between Rosemont Transportation Center and Elgin Transportation Center, stopping at Barrington Road and IL 25.

605: I-90/Randall Rd. Station - Rosemont Express 
Same route as 603 until IL 25 where it splits and continues on I-90 to Randall Road Station.

607: I-90/Randall Rd. Station - Schaumburg Express 
Operates between Randall Road and Northwest Transportation Center stopping at IL 25 and Barrington Road. 

The 603 and the 605 combined provide more frequent service at IL 25 and Barrington Road.

Other Pace routes, such as 610 and 606, also use I-90.

References 

Transportation in Chicago
Bus transportation in Illinois
Transportation in Cook County, Illinois
Regional Transportation Authority (Illinois)
2016 establishments in Illinois
Bus rapid transit in Illinois
Transportation in Kane County, Illinois